University Press of Sewanee was a university press affiliated with the University of the South, located in Sewanee, Tennessee. Founded in 1880, the press was, according to librarian Robert F. Lane, the fourth to issue publications under a university imprint in the United States. It was largely the brainchild of Bishop Leonidas Polk, who believed that it would be "an integral part of the institution".

The press published the "Sewanee Theological Library" textbook series, the Sewanee Review (issued quarterly), and the magazine Pathfinder (a monthly publication established by Glen Levin Swiggett that was devoted to art and literature). John Graham Sutherland, who died in 1985, is the last individual credited in the Bulletin of the University of the South as "Manager of the University Press".

See also

 List of English-language book publishing companies
 List of university presses

Notes

References

Book publishing companies based in Tennessee
Sewanee: The University of the South
University Press of Sewanee